Young People is a 1961 Mexican crime film directed by Luis Alcoriza. It was entered into the 11th Berlin International Film Festival.

Cast
 Teresa Velázquez - Olga (as Tere Velazquez)
 Julio Alemán - El Gato
 Adriana Roel - Alicia
 Rafael del Río - Gabriel
 Dacia González - Amiga de Alicia
 Fanny Schiller - Carmelita, Madre de 'El Gato'
 Miguel Manzano - Don Fernando
 Leopoldo Salazar
 Óscar Cuéllar
 Rosa María Gallardo - Amiga rubia de Alicia (as Rosa Ma. Gallardo)
 Arcelia Larrañaga
 Miguel Suárez - Amigo de Raúl
 Sonia Infante - Amiga de Alicia
 Lupe Carriles
 David Hayat
 Miguel Zaldivar - (as Miguel Zaldivar R.)
 Nicolás Rodríguez
 Guillermo Herrera - Bobby
 Enrique Rambal - Don Raúl, padre de Gabriel
 Carmen Montejo - Rosa, Madre de Alicia

References

External links

1961 films
1961 crime films
Mexican crime films
1960s Spanish-language films
Mexican black-and-white films
Films directed by Luis Alcoriza
1961 directorial debut films
1960s Mexican films